Interstate 92 may refer to:

 The original planned designation for Interstate 94 in Michigan between Detroit and Benton Harbor
 A designation for the proposed East–West Highway through northern New England

92